Internet War may refer to:

2007 cyberattacks on Estonia
Cyberattack
Cyberattacks during the 2008 South Ossetia war
Cyberterrorism
Cyberwarfare
Denial-of-service attack
Flamewar
First "Internet" War
iWar
2009 Macanese legislative election#Internet war
Scientology versus the Internet
War of Internet Addiction